Baek Seung-Jin (born 1982) is a South Korean economist of the United Nations, specializing in political economy of sustainable development.

Early life and education

Born in Seoul, South Korea in 1982, Baek Seung-Jin studied mathematics at Korea University where he earned qualification of U.S. Certified Public Accountants (CPA) and U.S. Associated Person (AP) of the Commodity Futures Trading Commission. He pursued graduate studies in strategy at the KDI School of Public Policy and Management where he was inspired to explore Technology S-Curve (Technology Life Cycle) and published a number of journal articles in its application to the field of strategic management. Later, he received his Ph.D. in political economy from the University of Bath.

Career

After completing his 26-months military service where in part he worked in the Cyber Terror Response Center of the National Police Agency, Baek started his professional career when he joined strategic management and research firms, including KPMG as a Senior Analyst, focusing on developing firm's management strategy. Upon successfully passing the UN Competitive Examination in 2009, he joined the United Nations, serving as an economist across various United Nations Secretariat entities where he primarily focused on knowledge production for the provision of evidence based advisory services to Member States on development plans, strategies and frameworks, including the Economic Commission for Latin America and the Caribbean, the Economic Commission for Africa, the Economic and Social Commission for Western Asia and the Resident Coordinator Office.

His policy research area of specialization lies at the nexus of sustainable development, structuralist economics and economic transformation. He is the author of numerous scholarly journal articles and policy briefs in these fields, author of columns at South Korean newspaper companies, The Hankyoreh and the Maeil Business Newspaper, as well as four books, published by Palgrave Macmillan, Routledge and South Korean publishers.

He has also been serving a number of community and society activities, including Chairperson of the Middle East Standing Committee for Public Diplomacy of the Peaceful Unification Advisory Council in South Korea, Executive Director of the Korean Association in Lebanon and various invited speakers, including the South Korea's Ministry of Foreign Affairs, Korean National Police University, Korea University and KDI School of Public Policy and Management.

Selected works

Papers

Books

See also
 Sustainable Development Goals
 Institutional economics

References

1981 births
Living people
21st-century South Korean economists
South Korean officials of the United Nations